Toponymy, toponymics, or toponomastics is the study of toponyms (proper names of places, also known as place names and geographic names), including their origins, meanings, usage and types. Toponym is the general term for a proper name of any geographical feature, and full scope of the term also includes proper names of all cosmographical features.

In a more specific sense, the term toponymy refers to an inventory of toponyms, while the discipline researching such names is referred to as toponymics or toponomastics. Toponymy is a branch of onomastics, the study of proper names of all kinds. A person who studies toponymy is called toponymist.

Etymology
The term toponymy come from  / , 'place', and  / , 'name'.
The Oxford English Dictionary records toponymy (meaning "place name") first appearing in English in 1876. Since then, toponym has come to replace the term place-name in professional discourse among geographers.

Toponymic typology
Toponyms can be divided in two principal groups:
 geonyms - proper names of all geographical features, on planet Earth.
 cosmonyms - proper names of cosmographical features, outside Earth.

Various types of geographical toponyms (geonyms) include, in alphabetical order: 
 agronyms - proper names of fields and plains.
 choronyms - proper names of regions or countries. 
 dromonyms - proper names of roads or any other transport routes by land, water or air.
 drymonyms - proper names of woods and forests.
 econyms - proper names of inhabited locations, like houses, villages, towns or cities, including:
 comonyms - proper names of villages.
 astionyms - proper names of towns and cities.
 hydronyms - proper names of various bodies of water, including:
 helonyms - proper names of swamps, marshes and bogs.
 limnonyms - proper names of lakes and ponds.
 oceanonyms - proper names of oceans.
 pelagonyms - proper names of seas.
 potamonyms - proper names of rivers and streams.
 insulonyms - proper names of islands.
 oronyms - proper names of relief features, like mountains, hills and valleys, including:
 speleonyms - proper names of caves or some other subterranean features.
 petronyms - proper names of rock climbing routes.
 urbanonyms - proper names of urban elements (streets, squares etc.) in settlements, including:
 agoronyms - proper names of squares and marketplaces.
 hodonyms - proper names of streets and roads.

Various types of cosmographical toponyms (cosmonyms) include: 
 asteroidonyms - proper names of asteroids.
 astronyms - proper names of stars and constellations.
 cometonyms - proper names of comets.
 meteoronyms - proper names of meteors.
 planetonyms - proper names of planets and planetary systems.

History
Probably the first toponymists were the storytellers and poets who explained the origin of specific place names as part of their tales; sometimes place-names served as the basis for their etiological legends. The process of folk etymology usually took over, whereby a false meaning was extracted from a name based on its structure or sounds. Thus, for example, the toponym of Hellespont was explained by Greek poets as being named after Helle, daughter of Athamas, who drowned there as she crossed it with her brother Phrixus on a flying golden ram. The name, however, is probably derived from an older language, such as Pelasgian, which was unknown to those who explained its origin. In his Names on the Globe, George R. Stewart theorizes that Hellespont originally meant something like 'narrow Pontus' or 'entrance to Pontus', Pontus being an ancient name for the region around the Black Sea, and by extension, for the sea itself.

Especially in the 19th century, the age of exploration, a lot of toponyms got a different name because of national pride. Thus the famous German cartographer Petermann thought that the naming of newly discovered physical features was one of the privileges of a map-editor, especially as he was fed up with forever encountering toponyms like 'Victoria', 'Wellington', 'Smith', 'Jones', etc. He writes: "While constructing the new map to specify the detailed topographical portrayal and after consulting with and authorization of messr. [Theodor] v[on] Heuglin and count Karl Graf von Waldburg-Zeil I have entered 118 names in the map: partly they are the names derived from celebrities of arctic explorations and discoveries, arctic travellers anyway as well as excellent friends, patrons, and participants of different nationalities in the newest northpolar expeditions, partly eminent German travellers in Africa, Australia, America ...".

How difficult it was to create a global system of naming toponyms was shown in the 11th edition of the Encyclopædia Britannica:
‘Another form of the terminological problem, to which reference was made above, is found in the transliteration of foreign names, and the conversion of the names of foreign places and countries into English equivalents. As regards the latter, there is no English standard which can be said to be universal, though in particular cases there is a convention which it would be absurd to attempt to displace for any reason of supposed superior accuracy. It would be pragmatical in the extreme to force upon the English-speaking world a system of calling all foreign places by their local names, even though it might be thought that each nationality had a right to settle the nomenclature of its country and the towns or districts within it. In general the English conventions must stand. One of these days the world may agree that an international nomenclature is desirable and feasible, but not yet;  and the country which its own citizens call Deutschland and the French l'Allemagne still remains Germany to those who use the English language. Similarly Cologne (Köln), Florence (Firenze), or Vienna (Wien) are bound to retain their English names in an English book. But all cases are not so simple. The world abounds in less important places, for which the English names have no standardized spelling; different English newspapers on a single day, or a single newspaper at intervals of a few weeks or months, give them several varieties of form; and in Asia or Africa the latest explorer always seems to have a preference for a new one which is unlike that adopted by rival geographers. When the Eleventh Edition of the Encyclopædia Britannica was started, the suggestion was made that the Royal Geographical Society of London — the premier geographical society of the world — might co-operate in an attempt to secure the adoption of a standard English geographical and topographical nomenclature. The Society, indeed, has a system of its own which to some extent aims at fulfilling this requirement, though it has failed to impose it upon general use; but unfortunately the Society's system breaks down by admitting a considerable number of exceptions and by failing to settle a very large number of cases which really themselves constitute the difficulty. The collaboration of the Royal Geographical Society for the purpose of enabling the Encyclopædia Britannica to give prominent literary expression to an authoritative spelling for every place-name included within its articles or maps was found to be impracticable; and it was therefore necessary for the Eleventh Edition to adopt a consistent spelling which would represent its own judgment and authority. It is hoped that by degrees this spelling may recommend itself in other quarters. Where reasonably possible, the local spelling popularized by the usage of post-offices or railways has been preferred to any purely philological system of transliteration, but there are numerous cases where even this test of public convenience breaks down and some form of Anglicization becomes essential to an English gazetteer having an organic unity of its own. Apart from the continuance of English conventions which appeared sufficiently crystallized, the most authoritative spelling of the foreign name has been given its simplest English transliteration, preference being given, in cases of doubt, to the form, for instance in African countries, adopted by the European nation in possession or control. In the absence of any central authority or international agreement, the result is occasionally different in some slight degree from any common English variant, but this cannot well be helped when English variants are so capricious, and none persistent; and the names selected are those which for purposes of reference combine the most accuracy with the least disturbance of familiar usage. Thus the German African colony of Kamerun is here called Cameroon, an English form which follows the common practice of English transliteration in regard to its initial letter, but departs, in deference to the official nomenclature, from the older English Cameroons, a plural no longer justifiable, although most English newspapers and maps still perpetuate it.’.

Toponyms may have different names through time, due to changes and developments in languages, political developments and border adjustments to name but a few. More recently many postcolonial countries revert to their own nomenclature for toponyms that have been named by colonial powers.

Toponomastics 
Place names provide the most useful geographical reference system in the world. Consistency and accuracy are essential in referring to a place to prevent confusion in everyday business and recreation.

A toponymist, through well-established local principles and procedures developed in cooperation and consultation with the United Nations Group of Experts on Geographical Names (UNGEGN), applies the science of toponymy to establish officially recognized geographical names. A toponymist relies not only on maps and local histories, but interviews with local residents to determine names with established local usage. The exact application of a toponym, its specific language, its pronunciation, and its origins and meaning are all important facts to be recorded during name surveys.

Scholars have found that toponyms provide valuable insight into the historical geography of a particular region. In 1954, F. M. Powicke said of place-name study that it "uses, enriches and tests the discoveries of archaeology and history and the rules of the philologists."

Toponyms not only illustrate ethnic settlement patterns, but they can also help identify discrete periods of immigration.

Toponymists are responsible for the active preservation of their region's culture through its toponymy. They typically ensure the ongoing development of a geographical names database and associated publications, for recording and disseminating authoritative hard-copy and digital toponymic data. This data may be disseminated in a wide variety of formats, including hard-copy topographic maps as well as digital formats such as geographic information systems, Google Maps, or thesauri like the Getty Thesaurus of Geographic Names.

Toponymic commemoration 
In 2002, the United Nations Conference on the Standardization of Geographical Names acknowledged that while common, the practice of naming geographical places after living persons (toponymic commemoration) could be problematic. Therefore, the United Nations Group of Experts on Geographical Names recommends that it be avoided and that national authorities should set their own guidelines as to the time required after a person's death for the use of a commemorative name.

In the same vein, writers Pinchevski and Torgovnik (2002) consider the naming of streets as a political act in which holders of the legitimate monopoly to name aspire to engrave their ideological views in the social space. Similarly, the revisionist practice of
renaming streets, as both the celebration of triumph and the repudiation of the old regime is another issue of toponymy. Also, in the context of Slavic nationalism, the name of Saint Petersburg was changed to the more Slavic sounding Petrograd from 1914 to 1924, then to Leningrad following the death of Vladimir Lenin and back to Saint-Peterburg in 1991 after the fall of the Soviet Union. After 1830, in the wake of the Greek War of Independence and the establishment of an independent Greek state, Turkish, Slavic and Italian place names were Hellenized, as an effort of "toponymic cleansing." This nationalization of place names can also manifest itself in a postcolonial context.

In Canada, there have been initiatives in recent years "to restore traditional names to reflect the Indigenous culture wherever possible". Indigenous mapping is a process that can include restoring place names by Indigenous communities themselves.

Frictions sometimes arise between countries because of toponymy, as illustrated by the Macedonia naming dispute in which Greece has claimed the name Macedonia, the Sea of Japan naming dispute between Japan and Korea, as well as the Persian Gulf naming dispute. On 20 September 1996 a note on the internet reflected a query by a Canadian surfer, who said as follows: 'One producer of maps labeled the water body 
"Persian Gulf" on a 1977 map of Iran, and then "Arabian Gulf", also in 1977, in a map which focused on the Gulf States. I would gather that this is an indication of the "politics of maps", but I would be interested to know if this was done to avoid upsetting users of the Iran map and users of the map showing Arab Gulf States'. This symbolizes a further aspect of the topic, namely the spilling over of the problem from the purely political to the economic sphere.

Geographic names boards

A geographic names board is an official body established by a government to decide on official names for geographical areas and features.

Most countries have such a body, which is commonly (but not always) known under this name. Also, in some countries (especially those organised on a federal basis), subdivisions such as individual states or provinces will have individual boards.

Individual geographic names boards include:
 Antarctic Place-names Commission
Commission nationale de toponymie (National toponymy commission - France)
 Geographical Names Board of Canada
 Geographical Names Board of New South Wales
New Zealand Geographic Board
 South African Geographical Names Council
 United States Board on Geographic Names

Notable toponymists

Marcel Aurousseau (1891–1983), Australian geographer, geologist, war hero, historian and translator
Andrew Breeze (born 1954), English linguist
William Bright (1928–2006), American linguist
Richard Coates (born 1949), English linguist
Joan Coromines (1905–1997), etymologist, dialectologist, toponymist
Albert Dauzat (1877–1955), French linguist
Eilert Ekwall (1877–1964, Sweden)

Henry Gannett (1846–1914), American geographer
Margaret Gelling (1924–2009), English toponymist
Michel Grosclaude (1926–2002), philosopher and French linguist
Erwin Gustav Gudde 
Ernest Nègre (1907–2000), French toponymist
W. F. H. Nicolaisen (1927–2016), folklorist, linguist, medievalist
Oliver Padel (born 1948), English medievalist and toponymist
Robert L. Ramsay (1880–1953), American linguist
Adrian Room (1933–2010), British toponymist and onomastician
Charles Rostaing (1904–1999), French linguist
Henry Schoolcraft (1793–1864), American geographer, geologist and ethnologist
Jan Paul Strid (1947–2018), Swedish toponymist
Walter Skeat (1835–1912), British philologist
Albert Hugh Smith (1903–1967), scholar of Old English and Scandinavian languages
Frank Stenton (1880–1967), historian of Anglo-Saxon England
George R. Stewart (1895–1980), American historian, toponymist and novelist
Isaac Taylor (1829–1901), philologist, toponymist and Anglican canon of York
James Hammond Trumbull (1821–1897), American scholar and philologist
William J. Watson (1865–1948), Scottish scholar

See also

Related concepts 

 Anthroponymy
 Demonymy
Ethnonymy
Exonym and endonym
 Gazetteer
 Lists of places
Oeconym

Toponymy 

Toponymic surname
Planetary nomenclature

Hydronymy 

Latin names of European rivers
Latin names of rivers
List of river name etymologies
Old European hydronymy

Regional toponymy 

Biblical toponyms in the United States
German toponymy
Germanic toponymy
Historical African place names
Japanese place names
Korean toponymy and list of place names
List of English exonyms for German toponyms
List of French exonyms for Dutch toponyms
List of French exonyms for German toponyms
List of French exonyms for Italian toponyms
List of Latin place names in Europe
List of modern names for biblical place names
List of renamed places in the United States
List of U.S. place names connected to Sweden
List of U.S. state name etymologies
List of U.S. state nicknames
Maghreb toponymy
Names of European cities in different languages
New Zealand place names
Oikonyms in Western and South Asia
Place names of Palestine
Hebraization of Palestinian place names
Place names in Sri Lanka
Roman place names
Toponyms of Finland
Toponymy in the United Kingdom and Ireland
Celtic toponymy
List of British places with Latin names
List of generic forms in British place names
List of places in the United Kingdom
List of Roman place names in Britain
Place names in Irish
Welsh place names
Territorial designation
Toponymical list of counties of the United Kingdom

Other 

Labeling (map design)
List of adjectival forms of place names
List of double placenames
List of long place names
List of names in English with counterintuitive pronunciations
List of places named after peace
List of places named after Lenin
List of places named after Stalin
List of places named for their main products
List of political entities named after people
List of short place names
List of tautological place names
List of words derived from toponyms
Lists of things named after places
List of geographic acronyms and initialisms
List of geographic portmanteaus
List of geographic anagrams and ananyms
United Nations Group of Experts on Geographical Names
UNGEGN Toponymic Guidelines

References

Sources

Further reading

 Berg, Lawrence D. and Jani Vuolteenaho. 2009. Critical Toponymies (Re-Materialising Cultural Geography). Ashgate Publishing. 

 Cablitz, Gabriele H. 2008. "When 'what' is 'where': A linguistic analysis of landscape terms, place names and body part terms in Marquesan (Oceanic, French Polynesia)." Language Sciences 30(2/3):200–26.
 Desjardins, Louis-Hébert. 1973. Les nons géographiques: lexique polyglotte, suivi d'un glossaire de 500 mots. Leméac.
 Hargitai, Henrik I. 2006. "Planetary Maps: Visualization and Nomenclature." Cartographica 41(2):149–64
Hargitai, Henrik I., Hugh S. Greqorv, Jan Osburq, and Dennis Hands. 2007. "Development of a Local Toponym System at the Mars Desert Research Station." Cartographica 42(2):179–87.
 
 Hercus, Luise, Flavia Hodges, and Jane Simpson. 2009. The Land is a Map: Placenames of Indigenous Origin in Australia. Pandanus Books.
 Kadmon, Naftali. 2000. Toponymy: the lore, laws, and language of geographical names. Vantage Press.

External links

Who Was Who in North American Name Study
Forgotten Toponymy Board (German)
The origins of British place names
An Index to the Historical Place Names of Cornwall
Celtic toponymy
The Doukhobor Gazetteer, Doukhobor Heritage website, by Jonathan Kalmakoff.
O'Brien Jr., Francis J. (Moondancer) “Indian Place Names—Aquidneck Indian Council”
Ghana Place Names
Index Anatolicus: Toponyms of Turkey
The University of Nottingham's: Key to English Place-names searchable map.
 The Etymology of Mars crater names

 
Place names